Hemiculter bleekeri is a temperate freshwater fish belonging to the Cultrinae subfamily of the family Cyprinidae.  It originates in the Amur River, Yangtze River, and the Yellow River basins in China.  It was originally described by N. A. Warpachowski in 1887 but it may be a junior synonym of Ussuri sharpbelly (Hemicultur lucidus).

The fish reaches a size of up to 17.0 cm (6.7 in) long.  Its diet primarily consists of plants and detritus.

References 
 

Hemiculter
Fish described in 1887